Pepe & Fifi is a 1994 Romanian drama film directed by Dan Pița. The film was selected as the Romanian entry for the Best Foreign Language Film at the 67th Academy Awards, but was not accepted as a nominee.

Cast
 Cristian Iacob as Pepe
 Irina Movila as Fifi

See also
 List of submissions to the 67th Academy Awards for Best Foreign Language Film
 List of Romanian submissions for the Academy Award for Best Foreign Language Film

References

External links
 

1994 films
1994 drama films
Romanian drama films
1990s Romanian-language films
Films directed by Dan Pița